Jorge Pontual (August 25, 1924 – 2014) was a Brazilian Olympic sailor in the Star class. He competed in the 1960 Summer Olympics together with Cid Nascimento, where they finished 9th. He was born in Rio de Janeiro, Brazil.

References

Olympic sailors of Brazil
Brazilian male sailors (sport)
Star class sailors
Sailors at the 1960 Summer Olympics – Star
1924 births
2014 deaths
Sportspeople from Rio de Janeiro (city)